The Vivaldi Residences Cubao is  a 40-storey mixed use residential, condotel tower located at the corner of EDSA and Aurora Blvd. in Quezon City, Philippines. The tower was named after Antonio Vivaldi, and is both owned and developed by Euro Towers International Inc.. serving as the company's first high-rise residential project in Metro Manila.

History

Before the construction of the project was established, the tower formerly sits on the former Ocean Theater, an old movie theater which opened in the area in the 1970s, and was closed in the 1990s, due to rising competition from malls, equipped with movie theaters and additional retail stores within Metro Manila. The theater was eventually auctioned for ownership in 2008, at a price tag of ₱58 million, with many companies bidding for the ownership of the property. The companies involved in the bidding for the property are SM Prime, the Araneta Group, First View Corp., and Eurotel. On November 18, 2008, Eurotel won the sale for the property, offering ₱91.8 million, after Then-Mayor Feliciano Belmonte Jr. and other Quezon City officials voted on the company's bet, beating SM Prime's ₱80 million and First View's ₱110 million bets, while the Araneta Group remains as the project's landlord, as the project sits within the vicinity of the Araneta City.

The Ocean Theater was demolished in 2009 to give way for the high-rise project, while the project broke ground in October 2011, before topping off in October 2014. On May 29, 2015, the tower's crane hook snagged off, and hit the tower's rooftop, while four construction workers secured the crane hook, to avoid it from falling to the ground, and cause casualties. Due to the incident, the tower's construction was delayed to its planned original opening in December 2015, but was subsequently completed in July 2016, as tenants and residents began occupying the building.

Architecture and Design
The building was inspired by European architecture with urban cosmopolitan tastes in a transit-oriented development. The tower was designed by a team led by Arturo R. Matubang, along with R.I.M.A. Partners and Co., while Rogelio I. Menguito is the project's Structural Designer. The company also tapped IIIDEAS Furniture & Furnishing Trading of Jean Paul De La Rosa was involved in the interior design of the building.

The structure was first to be issued a Green Building Certificate by the Quezon City local government, as the tower features energy-efficient and water-saving systems. The tower is also the only condominium in the Philippines as of September 2014 with a cantilevered pool situated in its topmost floor. The building also houses Eurotel on its first floors, which opened in October 2016.

Location
Situated within the Araneta City in Cubao, it is also accessible to major areas of Metro Manila via the  Manila Metro Rail Transit System Line 3 (Line 3) and the Manila Light Rail Transit System Line 2 (Line 2) train stations, as well as nearby jeepney and UV Express terminals.

See also
Vivaldi Residences Davao

References

External links
  Euro Towers International
  Vivaldi Residences

Residential condominiums in Metro Manila
Buildings and structures in Quezon City